Karl Gegenbaur (21 August 1826 – 14 June 1903) was a German anatomist and professor who demonstrated that the field of comparative anatomy offers important evidence supporting of the theory of evolution.  As a professor of anatomy at the University of Jena (1855–1873) and at the University of Heidelberg (1873–1903), Karl Gegenbaur was a strong supporter of Charles Darwin's theory of organic evolution, having taught and worked, beginning in 1858, with Ernst Haeckel, eight years his junior.

Gegenbaur's book Grundzüge der vergleichenden Anatomie
(1859; English translation Elements of Comparative Anatomy by Francis Jeffrey Bell, 1878) became the standard textbook, at the time, of evolutionary morphology, emphasizing that structural similarities among various animals provide clues to their evolutionary history. Karl Gegenbaur noted that the most reliable clue to evolutionary history is homology, the comparison of anatomical parts which have a common evolutionary origin.

Gegenbaur had been a student of Albert von Kölliker, Rudolf Virchow, Heinrich Müller and Franz Leydig (1821–1908).

Life
Karl Gegenbaur was born in Würzburg, Bavaria in 1826, and he entered the University of Würzburg as a student in 1845. After taking his degree in 1851, he spent some time in travelling in Italy and Sicily, before returning to Wurzburg as Privatdozent in 1854. In 1855, he was appointed extraordinary professor of anatomy at the University of Jena, and in 1858, he became the ordinary professor, where after 1865, his former student and fellow-worker Ernst Haeckel was professor of zoology.  In 1873, Gegenbaur was appointed to Heidelberg, where he was professor of anatomy and director of the Anatomical Institute until his retirement in 1901. He was elected a Foreign Honorary Member of the American Academy of Arts and Sciences in 1896. He died on 14 June 1903, at Heidelberg.

Impact

The work by which Gegenbaur is best known is his Grundriss der vergleichenden Anatomie (Leipzig, 1874; 2nd edition, 1878), translated into English by Francis Jeffrey Bell (as Elements of Comparative Anatomy, 1878), with additions by E. Ray Lankester. While recognizing the importance of comparative embryology in the study of descent, Gegenbaur laid stress on the higher value of comparative anatomy as the basis of the study of homologies, i.e. of the relations between corresponding parts in different animals, as, for example, the arm of man, with the foreleg of a horse, and with the wing of a fowl. A distinctive piece of work was effected by him in 1871 in supplementing the evidence adduced by Huxley in refutation of the skull-vertebrae theory: the theory of the origin of the skull from expanded vertebrae, which, formulated independently by Goethe and Oken, had been championed by Owen. Huxley demonstrated that the skull is built up of cartilaginous pieces; Gegenbaur showed that in the lowest (gristly) fishes, where hints of the original vertebrae might be most expected, the skull is an unsegmented gristly brain-box, and that in higher forms, the vertebral nature of the skull cannot be maintained, since many of the bones, notably those along the top of the skull, arise in the skin.

In 1858, the physician Ernst Haeckel studied under Gegenbaur at Jena, receiving a doctorate in zoology (after his medical degree), and became a professor at the same institution, the University of Jena (see: Ernst Haeckel).  Ernst Haeckel expanded on the ideas of Gegenbaur while advocating the concepts of Charles Darwin.

In 1861, he published "Ueber den Bau und die Entwickelung der Wirbelthier-Eier mit partielleer Dotterbildung" ("Proof that the ovum is unicellular in all vertebrates", Arch. Anat. Phys., 1861.8: 461–529), a fundamental proof in embryology.

Gegenbaur learned techniques as a student of Albert von Kölliker, Rudolf Virchow, Heinrich Müller and Franz Leydig (1821–1908).  Karl Gegenbaur had a strong influence on his environment, with his colleagues Matthias Jakob Schleiden, Emil Huschke, Ernst Haeckel, and Hermann Klaatsch (1863–1916).
Karl Gegenbaur also influenced his students, including: Max Fürbringer, Richard Hertwig, Oskar Hertwig, Emil Rosenberg, Ambrosius Hubrecht, Johan Erik Vesti Boas (1855–1935), Hans Friedrich Gadow, Georg Ruge M. Sagemehl, N. Goronowitsch, H. K. Corning, C. Röse and S. Paulli.

Gegenbaur's research program of comparative morphology incorporating ontogeny and phylogeny is still evident in the burgeoning field of evolutionary developmental biology (evo-devo).

Other publications
Other publications by Karl Gegenbaur include a Text-book of Human Anatomy (Leipzig, 1883, new ed. 1903), the Epiglottis (1892) and Comparative Anatomy of the Vertebrates in relation to the Invertebrates (Leipzig, 2 vols., 1898–1901). In 1875, he founded the Morphologisches Jahrbuch ("Morphological Yearbook"), which he edited for many years. In 1901 he published a short autobiography under the title Erlebtes und Erstrebtes (German "experiencing and striving").

References

Attribution

Further reading

External links
 

1826 births
1903 deaths
19th-century German zoologists
Physicians from Würzburg
People from the Kingdom of Bavaria
Recipients of the Copley Medal
University of Würzburg alumni
Academic staff of the University of Würzburg
Academic staff of the University of Jena
Academic staff of Heidelberg University
Fellows of the American Academy of Arts and Sciences
Foreign associates of the National Academy of Sciences
Foreign Members of the Royal Society
Corresponding members of the Saint Petersburg Academy of Sciences
Recipients of the Pour le Mérite (civil class)
Members of the Göttingen Academy of Sciences and Humanities